Töpen is a municipality  in Upper Franconia in the district of Hof in Bavaria in Germany.

History
Between 1945 and 1966 Töpen served as West German inner German border crossing for cars travelling between the Soviet Zone of occupation in Germany (till 1949, thereafter the East German Democratic Republic), or West Berlin and the American zone of occupation (till 1949) and thereafter the West German Federal Republic of Germany. The traffic was subject to the Interzonal traffic regulations, that between West Germany and West Berlin followed the special regulations of the Transit Agreement (1972). In 1966 the border crossing was closed in favour of a new crossing in Rudolphstein, a component of Berg in Upper Franconia.

See also
Mödlareuth

References

External links

Hof (district)
Inner German border